Ernest Martin may refer to:

 Ernest Martin (murderer) (1960–2003), American executed by the State of Ohio for murder
 Ernest Martin (theatre) (1932-), theatre director and manager
 Ernest H. Martin (1919–1995), Broadway producer
 Ernest L. Martin (1932–2002), meteorologist and author on Biblical topics
 Ernie Martin (1903–1996), Australian rules footballer
 Ernest Martin (swimmer) (born 1878), French Olympic swimmer and water polo player